Chintamani may refer to:
Chintamani or Cintamani (jewel), a wish-fulfilling jewel in both Hindu and Buddhist traditions

The Tamil epic Cīvaka Cintāmaṇi, one of the five great Tamil epics of 5th century.

Places
Chintamani, Karnataka, a town in Karnataka, India
Chintamani (Vidhana Sabha constituency), an Assembly seat in Karnataka, India
Chintamani, Tiruchirappalli, a neighborhood in Tamil Nadu, India
Chintamani Kar Bird Sanctuary, a wildlife sanctuary in West Bengal, India
Chintamani Temple, Theur, a Hindu Ganesha shrine in near Pune in Maharashtra, India

Films
Chintamani (1933 film), a Telugu film by K. S. Rao
Chintamani (1937 film), a Tamil film by Y. V. Rao
Chintamani (1956 film), a Telugu film by P. S. Ramakrishna Rao

People
Chintamani Nagesa Ramachandra Rao (born 1934), Indian chemist
Chintamani Tryambak Khanolkar (1930–1976), Indian writer in the Marathi language
Chintamani Panigrahi (1922–2000), Indian activist, political and social leader from Orissa
C. Y. Chintamani (1880–1941), Indian editor, journalist and politician

other
Chintamani (newspaper), a Tamil weekly newspaper, published in Colombo